Hajjiabad (also Romanized as Hājjīābād and Ḩājīābād) is a village in Mardehek Rural District, Jebalbarez-e Jonubi District, Anbarabad County, Kerman Province, Iran. At the 2006 census, its population was 289, in 67 families.

References 

Populated places in Anbarabad County